The Kosanica is a river in southern Serbia. It is a southern, right tributary of the Toplica near Kuršumlija. The river is 34 km long and gives its name to the area it flows through, which constitutes with the south part of Kuršumlija municipality in south Serbia.

Rivers of Serbia